The Gershon Efficiency Review was a review of efficiency in the UK public sector conducted in 2003-4 by Sir Peter Gershon.

Gordon Brown and Tony Blair, then Chancellor of the Exchequer and Prime Minister respectively, appointed Peter Gershon, at that time the head of the Office of Government Commerce, to review operations across all public services and make recommendations regarding expenditure and efficiency. His report recommended making savings for Financial Year 2005-6, to be achieved through dramatic changes to the organisation of each government department and automating their work patterns, in order to 'release' resources from the public sector budget that was then approximately £520bn. These gross savings of £21.5bn were reported to have been achieved by 2007 and agreed as part of the Comprehensive Spending Review in 2004 and subsequent budget.

The effect of these objectives has been for all government departments to agree reductions on their long-term budgets, and then work out how to fulfill these challenging promises without crippling their existing obligations and service.

Benefits 
Certain functions were identified as offering good opportunities for savings through the use of ICT, such as tax collection and benefits payments. Aggregating and reorganising other functions offers the promise of savings in procurement, buildings and facilities. 
The approach encourages departments to meet the government's desire for 'Joined-up Government' that smooths out the delivery of services, and supports initiatives such as the use of a Common Systems Strategy as suggested in Sir David Varney's Report and the Transformational Government strategy.

Problems 
However, not all government functions present such clear opportunities; those with a large proportion of physical assets or customer-facing staff have great challenges to offer the equivalent level of savings without suffering damage to their level of service.

The timeframe also gives these organisations the challenge of investing in new services at a time when departmental headcount and budgets are being cut. In reality, the 'Gershon reviews' have been applied in waves across organisations.

In many instances the Treasury has interpreted this release of resources to be a cost saving for reallocation outside to other projects or departments.

Relocations recommended by Gershon have resulted in considerable loss of expertise, for example at the UK's Office For National Statistics, which has been criticized by the Chair of the Treasury Select committee.

Team members
The team that supported Sir Peter Gershon in this work was drawn from a number of Government departments and consultancy organisations:
 Simon King, HEDRA
 Anna Longman, HM Treasury
 Gillian Magee, PA Consulting Group
 Sue Moon, Kent and Medway NHS Strategic Health Authority
 Graham Murray, IBM
 John Pendlebury-Green, PA Consulting Group
 Sheila Pringle, Deloitte and Touche
 Neil Reeder, HM Treasury
 Bill Roots, Solace Enterprises
 Nathalie Ross, Nathalie Ross Consulting
 Tony Smith, IBM
 Mike Binnington Deloitte and Touche
 James Bromiley National Audit Office
 Alan Collier OGC
 Paul Connolly HEDRA
 Rob Devlen Hewlett Packard
 Zoe Elliot Cabinet Office
 Nicholas Fox IBM
 Gerry Friell HM Treasury
 Paul Kirby Cabinet Office
 Liz Lawrence Cabinet Office
 John Hood PA Consulting
 Rebecca Khodr Cabinet Office
 Judi Stockwell, PA Consulting Group
 Jenny Swan, Ofgem
 Emily Teller, Cabinet Office
 Graham Turnock, HM Treasury
 Bob Walding, Audit Commission
 Graham Walker, Office of the e-Envoy
 Martin Walker, Hewlett Packard
 Andrew Ward, PA Consulting Group
 Alice Webb, PA Consulting Group
 David Williams, Insource Solutions
 Marian Wilson, Inland Revenue
 Nadia Zahawi, HEDRA

Notes

References

External links
Gershon Review
Where are they now… Sir Peter Gershon  Silicon.com Friday 27 August 2004
Varney Report
Transformational Government Annual Report 2006
Regional Centres of Excellence - Efficiency Agenda

Quality
Local government in the United Kingdom
Public sector in the United Kingdom
2004 in the United Kingdom
2005 in the United Kingdom